The Company TTK — 2010 Russian Football Super Cup (Russian: Компания ТТК — Суперкубок России по футболу) was the 8th Russian Super Cup match, a football match which was contested between the 2009 Russian Premier League champion, Rubin Kazan, and the winner of 2008–09 Russian Cup, CSKA Moscow. The match was held on 7 March 2010 at the Luzhniki Stadium in Moscow, Russia. Rubin Kazan beat CSKA Moscow 1–0, to win their first Russian Super Cup.

Match details

References

See also 
 2010 in Russian football
 2009 Russian Premier League
 2008–09 Russian Cup

Super Cup
Russian Super Cup
Russian Super Cup 2010
Russian Super Cup 2010
March 2010 sports events in Russia
2010 in Moscow
Sports competitions in Moscow